Peptidyl-prolyl cis-trans isomerase FKBP1A is an enzyme that in humans is encoded by the FKBP1A gene. It is also commonly referred to as FKBP-12 or FKBP12 and is a member of a family of FK506-binding proteins (FKBPs).

Function 

The protein encoded by this gene is a member of the immunophilin protein family, which play a role in immunoregulation and basic cellular processes involving protein folding and trafficking. This encoded protein is a cis-trans prolyl isomerase that binds the immunosuppressants FK506 (tacrolimus) and rapamycin (sirolimus). It interacts with several intracellular signal transduction proteins including type I TGF-beta receptor. It also interacts with multiple intracellular calcium release channels including the tetrameric skeletal muscle ryanodine receptor. In mouse, deletion of this homologous gene causes congenital heart disorder known as noncompaction of left ventricular myocardium. Multiple alternatively spliced variants, encoding the same protein, have been identified. The human genome contains five pseudogenes related to this gene, at least one of which is transcribed.

Interactions 

FKBP1A has been shown to interact with:

 GLMN, 
 ITPR1 
 KIAA1303,
 Mammalian target of rapamycin, 
 RYR1,  and
 TGF beta receptor 1.

References

Further reading 

 
 
 
 
 
 
 
 
 
 
 
 
 
 
 
 
 
 
 

EC 5.2.1